Banner Township is a township in Ashley County, Arkansas, United States. Its total population was 158 as of the 2010 United States Census, a decrease of 7.6 percent from 171 at the 2000 census.

According to the 2010 Census, Banner Township is located at  (33.281880, -91.607009).

References

External links 

Townships in Arkansas
Townships in Ashley County, Arkansas